Game of Arms is an American television series that debuted February 25, 2014, on AMC. The series is a reality television show about American competitive arm wrestlers. The series follows arm wrestling clubs in Erie, Pennsylvania; Kansas City, Missouri; New York City; Sacramento, California, and Baton Rouge, Louisiana. Prior to its broadcast, the series was initially known as King of Arms.

On September 11, 2014, AMC renewed the series for a second season. However it canceled the series a month later in mid-production as part of the network ending nearly all their reality series and refocusing completely on fictional dramas for their original series output.

Episodes

Reception
Upon airing, the premiere was watched by 1 million viewers, with 626,000 of those viewers among adults 18-49. It is AMC's highest-rated reality series premiere of all time.

References

External links

2014 American television series debuts
2014 American television series endings
English-language television shows
AMC (TV channel) original programming
American sports television series
Arm wrestling